Games-X was a multi-format weekly computer and video game magazine published in the United Kingdom. It was launched in May 1991. The publisher was Europress. Editor Hugh Gollner later described it "a big mistake" in terms of finances.

See also
Maverick Magazines

References

External links
Archived Games-X magazines on the Internet Archive
1991 establishments in the United Kingdom
1992 disestablishments in the United Kingdom
Video game magazines published in the United Kingdom
Weekly magazines published in the United Kingdom
Defunct computer magazines published in the United Kingdom
Magazines established in 1991
Magazines disestablished in 1992
Video gaming in the United Kingdom